Jackie Spencer Moore (born February 19, 1939) is an American former professional baseball catcher, coach and manager. He spent all or parts of 12 years over five separate terms as a Texas Rangers coach, and 32 years in all as a coach for eight different Major League Baseball (MLB) teams.

Playing career
After graduating from Bellaire High School in Houston, Texas, Moore joined the Tigers as an amateur free agent in  when just eighteen years old. He hit .264, with 43 home runs and 162 runs batted in, in the eight years in the Tigers' farm system before being called up to the parent club for the 1965 season only.

He caught 12 innings of a 13-inning marathon against the California Angels in his Major League debut, and his first MLB hit was a thirteenth-inning single that moved the eventual winning run to third. But after that, he didn't get much playing time behind perennial All-Star Bill Freehan and backup catcher John Sullivan.

His MLB career consisted of just 53 at-bats with a meager .094 batting average. On October 4, the Tigers acquired starting pitcher Bill Monbouquette from the Boston Red Sox for George Smith, George Thomas and a player to be named later, which turned out to be Moore just nine days later. He spent 1967 in the BoSox organization as a catcher for the Triple-A Toronto Maple Leafs of the International League before retiring as an active player.

Brewers, Rangers, Blue Jays and Athletics coach (1970–84)
Despite his brief playing stint in the Majors, Moore spent over forty years coaching in the game, most of which has been at the MLB level.

His post-playing career began in the Red Sox farm system in 1968 as the manager of the Jamestown Falcons of the short-season Class A New York–Penn League. In two seasons under Moore, Jamestown went 64–85.  He then was hired as bullpen coach for the Seattle Pilots shortly after their one and only season in Major League Baseball (1969), and went with them when they moved to Milwaukee and became the Brewers starting in 1970. He was their bullpen coach through , when he was released at the end of the season.

In , Moore was hired by new Texas Rangers' manager Whitey Herzog as his first-base coach, beginning his first stint with the team. But on July 20, 1975, Martin was fired and replaced by third-base coach Frank Lucchesi, and Moore was called back to the Rangers to fill a vacancy on Lucchesi's staff, his second turn as one of the club's coaches.

Moore stayed with Lucchesi and the Rangers through , before he joined one of the American League's  expansion teams, the Toronto Blue Jays. He spent three seasons in Toronto working for skipper Roy Hartsfield, but when Hartsfield was replaced by Bobby Mattick, Moore also departed.

Oakland manager (1984–86)
In , Billy Martin, now manager of the Oakland Athletics, invited Moore to coach first base for his "Billy Ball" team. In his only full season at the helm, the A's went 77–85.

The  Athletics' record hovered around .500 until an 8–23 skid dropped the team's record to 29–44 in mid-June, worst in the majors. Moore, who went 163–190 (.462) in his 2+ years managing the A's, was replaced on an interim basis on June 25 by Jeff Newman, and in early July by Tony La Russa, who stayed in Oakland through 1995.

Expos, Reds, Rangers and Rockies' coach (1987–99)
In , Moore caught on as a coach with the Montreal Expos under manager Buck Rodgers, and was Montreal's third-base coach through .

Round Rock Express (2000–07)
In , Moore was appointed the first manager in the history of the Round Rock Express, the Double-A affiliate of the Houston Astros owned by a syndicate that included Baseball Hall of Fame pitcher Nolan Ryan. He led his team to a Texas League championship with an 83–57 record in their first season to earn the Texas League Manager of the Year Award. Moore was named the league's Manager of the Year again in 2001 and 2004.

In , the Express moved up to Triple-A in the Pacific Coast League.

In his five Texas League seasons the Express went 376–324; in the Pacific Coast League, 220–210.

Return to the Majors as a coach (2008)
On September 30, 2007, he was named the Houston Astros' bench coach for the  season by manager Cecil Cooper. Moore was Cooper's first professional baseball manager with Jamestown in 1968. After just one season, Moore left the Astros to begin his fifth term as a coach with the Texas Rangers, reuniting him with Ryan, then club president of the Rangers. After the Rangers' defeat at the hands of the Tampa Bay Rays in a one-game playoff on September 30, 2013, Moore, 74, was notified he would not return as the club's bench coach for 2014.

Personal life
Moore and his wife, JoAnn, have two sons, Spencer and Johnathon. Johnathon was drafted by Texas in the 45th round of the 2010 Major League Baseball draft, and is currently a catcher/first baseman with the Arizona Fall League AZL Rangers.
Moore has four children from his first marriage: Debby, Sherry, Jackie Jr., and Wanda.

References

External links

1939 births
Living people
American expatriate baseball players in Canada
Augusta Tigers players
Baseball coaches from Florida
Baseball players from Florida
Cincinnati Reds coaches
Colorado Rockies (baseball) coaches
Denver Bears players
Detroit Tigers players
Durham Bulls players
Houston Astros coaches
Knoxville Smokies players
Major League Baseball bench coaches
Major League Baseball catchers
Milwaukee Brewers coaches
Minor league baseball managers
Montgomery Rebels players
Montreal Expos coaches
Oakland Athletics coaches
Oakland Athletics managers
Syracuse Chiefs players
Texas Rangers coaches
Toronto Blue Jays coaches
Toronto Maple Leafs (International League) players
United States national baseball team people
Valdosta Tigers players
American expatriate baseball people in Venezuela